Ambasse bey or ambas-i-bay is a style of folk music and dance from Cameroon. The music is based on commonly available instruments, especially guitar, with percussion provided by sticks and bottles. The music is faster-paced than assiko.

John Hall described its rhythm as the one of a moving broom. Where dancers swing their shoulders like the wings of birds, the dance is composed of sequences of fluid steps and jerky body movements performed in accordance with the music, which is generally the makossa. In order to perform this dance, the dancers must wear traditional sawa outfits.

Ambasse bey originated among the Yabassi ethnic group and grew popular in Douala after World War II. Through the 1950s and 1960s, the style evolved in the Cameroonian Littoral. In the mid-1960s, Eboa Lotin performed a style of ambasse bey on harmonica and guitar that was the earliest form of makossa, a style that quickly came to overshadow its predecessor and become Cameroon's most popular form of indigenous music. Ambasse bey was revived to an extent by Cameroonian singer Sallé John.

Notes

References
Chrispin, Pettang, directeur, Cameroun: Guide touristique. Paris: Les Éditions Wala.
DeLancey, Mark W., and Mark Dike DeLancey (2000): Historical Dictionary of the Republic of Cameroon (3rd ed.). Lanham, Maryland: The Scarecrow Press.
Mbaku, John Mukum (2005). Culture and Customs of Cameroon. Westport, Connecticut: Greenwood Press.

African dances
Cameroonian styles of music